Crystal Renee Aikin (born September 21, 1974) is an American gospel singer-songwriter from Tacoma, Washington, and the winner of the first season of Sunday Best. Her eponymous debut album was released on January 13, 2009, through Verity Records.

Biography

Early life and career 
Aikin grew up in Tacoma, Washington. Since her childhood, she attended Altheimer Memorial Church of God in Christ, where she sang in the Sunshine Band. During her teen and young adult years, she sang on the Praise and Worship team while becoming recognized as a local singer in the Tacoma-Seattle area. During this time, Aikin also obtained a Bachelor's degree in Biology and Psychology.

While a teenager, Aikin was part of a local group called Heaven Sent Us. In the late 1990s, Aikin joined a local singing group called Soul (Hendrix/Trinity Records). This group gave her more exposure outside of the Tacoma area, even performing at the Gospel Music Workshop of America.

After leaving Soul, Aikin continued singing in the Tacoma area. In 2005, she enrolled at Pacific Lutheran University and obtained a nursing degree. Aikin's mother, a registered nurse also, is a Professor of Nursing at the university. After that, she started working as an emergency room nurse.

Sunday Best

In 2007, Aikin auditioned for the reality television contest, Sunday Best, where Christian singers compete for a record contract in the Christian music industry. After being chosen to participate, Aikin went to Los Angeles. After several weeks of competition, she finished in first place, winning a recording contract with Zomba Gospel Music (now Verity Gospel Music Group). She also won a 2008 Toyota Camry.

Performances/results

Post Sunday Best career

After signing with Verity, Aikin released her eponymous debut album on March 17, 2009. The album featured producer contributions from PAJAM, Dre & Vidal, Gerald Haddon, Derek Clark, and Asaph Ward, among others.

In 2010, she was nominated for a GMA Dove Award for New Artist of the Year at the 41st GMA Dove Awards.

Discography

Albums

Awards and nominations

References

External links

Living people
Pacific University alumni
African-American women singer-songwriters
Singers from Tacoma, Washington
1974 births
African-American Christians
21st-century American women singers
21st-century American singers
21st-century African-American women singers
20th-century African-American people
20th-century African-American women
Singer-songwriters from Washington (state)